Lalai Singh Yadav (1921-1993) was a policeman in paramilitary who became a social justice activist and play writer. He wrote plays like Shambhuk Vadh. He translated Periyar E. V. Ramasamy's The Key To Understanding True Ramayan from Tamil to Hindi as Sachi Ramayan Ki Chabi. In 1962, he wrote a book entitled Baman Vadi Rajya Mein Shoshito Par Rajnaitik Dakaiti. He fought a free speech case against the UP Government on his book ban.

Apart from translating True Ramayan, he wrote 5 plays as well, including one on Aṅgulimāla, Shambuka, and Ekalavya.

Conversion to Buddhism 
Lalai Singh Yadav was an Ambedkarite Buddhist.

He renounced Hinduism in 1967 and embraced Buddhism. After adopting Buddhism, he removed the word Yadav from his name. His deep anti-caste consciousness was working behind the removal of the word Yadav.

See also
A.R. Akela
Periyar
Dalit studies

References 

20th-century Indian male writers
Indian male dramatists and playwrights
Indian Buddhists
20th-century Buddhists
Indian social workers
Converts to Buddhism from Hinduism
20th-century Indian dramatists and playwrights
Dramatists and playwrights from Uttar Pradesh
1921 births
1993 deaths